Borrowed Heaven is the fourth studio album by Irish rock band the Corrs, released through Atlantic Records on 31 May 2004. The album was produced by Olle Romo.

The band released three singles from this album: "Summer Sunshine", "Angel", and "Long Night". A remix version of "Goodbye" was released as a download-only single in 2006. Other notable tracks include the title track "Borrowed Heaven", which featured an appearance from Ladysmith Black Mambazo, and "Time Enough for Tears", which was penned by U2's Bono and featured in the 2002 film In America, for which it was nominated for the Golden Globe Award for Best Original Song. The acoustic performances for this album's Electronic Press Kit were recorded at the Trinity Laban Conservatoire of Music and Dance. The album would be their last album of original material until White Light (2015).

Critical reception

Borrowed Heaven received mixed reviews from music critics. At Metacritic, the album has garnered a score of 58 over 100, based on 7 mainstream critics, indicating "mixed or average" reviews.

Commercial performance 
The album was a great success in their homeland Ireland where it peaked at number 1, with all three singles entering the Irish music charts. The album was greeted with success in western Europe, charting in nearly every country. Success in eastern Europe was varied from number 1 chart positions to not charting at all.

The Corrs set off on the Borrowed Heaven Tour in June 2004, taking the band to Europe and North America. This would be the Corrs' last tour before taking an extended hiatus in 2006 to raise families and embark on solo careers.

Track listing

Personnel

The band 
 Andrea Corr – lead vocals, tin whistle
 Caroline Corr – drums, percussion, bodhran, vocals
 Jim Corr – acoustic and electric guitars, keyboards, piano
 Sharon Corr – violin, vocals

Additional musicians 
 Tim Pierce – additional guitars on "Angel", "Even If" and "Time Enough for Tears"
 Anthony Drennan – additional guitars on "Silver Strand"
 John O'Brien – additional programming on all songs
 Pecka Erkesjo – bass on "Time Enough for Tears"
 Jon Button – upright bass on "Time Enough for Tears"
 Jim McGorman – piano on "Summer Sunshine"
 Jeff Babko – piano on "Time Enough for Tears"
 Ladysmith Black Mambazo – backing Vocals on "Borrowed Heaven"

Charts

Weekly charts

Year-end charts

Certifications

Release history

References 

2004 albums
The Corrs albums
Albums produced by Olle Romo
Atlantic Records albums